Barbara Woof (born 1958) is an Australian-Dutch composer and music educator.

Biography
Barbara Woof was born in Sydney, Australia.  She studied composition at the University of Sydney with Peter Sculthorpe and graduated in 1980 cum laude with a Bachelor of Music diploma. She received a scholarship in 1981 to study in the Netherlands, and then completed further studies in 1985 at the Royal Conservatory of The Hague with Peter Schat and Jan van Vlijmen. She also studied electronic composition with Jan Boerman and analog studio technology at the Institute of Sonology in Utrecht with Jaap Vink.

From 1988–2010, Woof taught 20th-century music analysis, instrumentation and composition at the Faculty of Arts, Media and Technology at the School of the Arts in Utrecht. In 1992 she was composer in residence at the Australian Broadcasting Corporation. She received the Martim Codax Prize in Vigo, Spain, for the electronic composition Syzygy.

Works
Woof composed works for orchestra, chamber ensemble and solo instruments. Selected works include:

Hommage à Odilon Redon (1981), for orchestra (Gaudeamus Music Week 1983)
Maldoror (1983), for violin (Gaudeamus Music Week 1984)
Star-Streams (1987), for harpsichord and percussion (New Music *Festival Middelburg 1987)
Canzone (1989), for orchestra (for the Dutch Student Orchestra tour 1990)
Soundings, for Javanese gamelan (Dutch Music Days 1997)
Night Journey (1993), for chamber orchestra (Holland Festival 1993)
Dervish (1995), for clarinet (Consequenze Festival, Rotterdam Art Foundation 1995)
Tárogató-Rag (1998), the Rosa Ensemble (Dutch Music Days 1998).
Naxos revisited (2003) for soprano and electronic soundtracks ( Australian Computer Music Conference July 2008)
Tromba Marina (2006) for String Quartet and electronics for the Zephyr Stringkwartet as part of a project "The Fifth String" in collaboration with the Utrecht Composers Collective: tour in the Netherlands, 2006.
White Heat (2006) for choir, percussion and two pianos for Het Hollands Vocaal Ensemble: tour in the Netherlands, 2006.
Semanit Lalu (2007) for large ensemble: tour Basho Ensemble, in The Netherlands, 2007.
Triangulation (2008) for bass clarinet, cello, piano and electronics as part of a project "The Rulemasters" in collaboration with the Utrecht Composers Collective: tour in the Netherlands, 2008/9.
Chinese Whispers (2009) for mixed choir and electronics as part of a project "chorus ex machina" in collaboration with The Utrechts Composers’ Collective : tour in the Netherlands, 2009/10

Discography
Ensemble Gending Plays 20th Century Gamelan Music by Dutch Composers: Ton de Leeuw, Barbara Woof, Paul Termos, Will Eisma & Armeno Alberts (1997) - Audio CD by Various Artists by Nm Classics, ASIN: B000001MY3
Time Machine: An Anthology of Music from the Netherlands- Audio CD by Peter van Anrooy, Hans Koolmees, Unico van Wassenaer, Barbara Woof, Martijn Padding, et al., Muziekgroeo Nederland, ASIN: B002L0OYTU

References

1958 births
Living people
Dutch women classical composers
Dutch classical composers
Australian emigrants to the Netherlands
Dutch music educators
Australian music educators
Australian women classical composers
Royal Conservatory of The Hague alumni
Australian classical composers
Musicians from Sydney
Women music educators